"Mirror Mirror" (also titled as "Mirror Mirror (Mon Amour)") is a song by British pop duo Dollar, released in 1981 as the second single from their third album, The Dollar Album. The song was co-written by Trevor Horn and Bruce Woolley, and produced by Horn.

The song was the follow-up single to "Hand Held in Black and White", which had revived the duo's career in the summer of 1981 when it became their first top 20 hit for a year and a half. "Mirror Mirror" charted over the Christmas period in 1981 and was the biggest hit of Dollar's career. It reached No. 4 in the UK and spent a total of 17 weeks on the chart. It also reached No. 5 in Ireland.

A promotional video was made to accompany the song, featuring members David Van Day and Thereza Bazar as wooden dolls coming to life. The B-side of the single was a song written by the duo called "Radio", which had been the opening track on their second album The Paris Collection.

Track listing 
 "Mirror Mirror" (Horn/Woolley) 3:25
 "Radio" (Bazar/Van Day) 3:45

References 

1981 songs
1981 singles
British synth-pop songs
British new wave songs
Song recordings produced by Trevor Horn
Dollar (band) songs
Songs written by Trevor Horn
Songs written by Bruce Woolley
Warner Music Group singles